

Elvanfoot is a small village in South Lanarkshire, Scotland.

Elvanfoot is located at the confluence of the River Clyde and Elvan Water. The Clyde is crossed by a pedestrian suspension bridge that has been closed since 2007 for want of repair. The apparently-abandoned church is on the Buildings at Risk Register for Scotland, as are the stables of Newton House, once home to the Scottish judge Alexander Irving, Lord Newton.

Etymology
The name 'Elvan' apparently includes the element *al-, which occurs in river names in Roman Britain and continental Europe. A number of meanings have been suggested, including 'bright, shining, white', 'sparkling, speckled' and 'holy' amongst others. Almost all attestations of the root occur with the Proto-Indo-European suffix -*awe- and "root-determinative -*n- or participial -*ant-", giving the proto-form *al-au-n-.

Andrew Breeze has suggested that the name is derived from Cumbric *halẹ:n 'salt', cognate with Welsh halen, which is found in a number of Welsh river names. As Elvan Water passes through a mining area, Breeze suggests that there may be high levels of salt in the river. The loss of initial /h/ could be explained as a result of the name's transmission via Gaelic.

Transport
Until 1965 it was served by Elvanfoot railway station on the West Coast Main Line. The village is also served by Stagecoach West Scotland service 102 from Edinburgh to Dumfries which operates 1 bus each day in each direction, There used to be 2 buses per day but were cut due to Council funding being reduced.

References

Villages in South Lanarkshire